Hjallerup market is a market in Hjallerup, about  northeast of Aalborg, Jutland, Denmark. It is one of the oldest and largest markets in Denmark and is the largest horse market in Europe. Held for three days in the beginning of June, it annually attracts more than 200,000 people and 1200 horses.

References

Bibliography

Economy of Denmark
Horse auction houses